Jeanne Agnès Berthelot de Pléneuf, marquise de Prie (August 1698 – 7 October 1727), was a French noblewoman who for a brief period exercised extraordinary control of the French court during the reign of King Louis XV.

Life
She was the daughter of the wealthy but unscrupulous financier Étienne Berthelot de Pléneuf. At the age of fifteen she was married to penniless Norman aristocrat Louis de Prie (1673-1751), marquis de Plasnes (with Courbépine), known as the marquis de Prie, and went with him to the court of Savoy at Turin, where he was ambassador.

At the age of 21, she returned to France, and was soon the declared mistress of Louis Henri, Duke of Bourbon ("Monsieur le Duc"), who was prime minister at the beginning of the reign of Louis XV (1723-1726). During his ministry she dominated the royal court and engineered the marriage of Louis XV of France to Marie Leszczynska instead of Mademoiselle de Vermandois, the younger sister of the Duke of Bourbon. In 1725, her scheme to have Bourbon's rival Fleury exiled failed. Instead, Fleury was recalled and in turn became prime minister causing Bourbon to be banished to his castle at Chantilly.

In 1725, at the time of Louis XV's marriage, she brought Voltaire to court. Thanks to her, three pieces by Voltaire were included in the wedding festivities.

Madame de Prie was exiled to Courbépine, where she committed suicide the next year.

Her exile from the court and suicide are the subject of a short fictional work by Stefan Zweig, "Geschichte eines Unterganges" or "Story of a Downfall" (1910).

At the start of Alexandre Dumas' drama Mademoiselle de Belle-Isle (1839), the Duke of Richelieu breaks off a relationship with the Marquise de Prie while the latter is titular mistress of the Duke of Bourbon.

Charlotte Rampling played de Prie in the 1996 TV movie La dernière fête, titled in English The Fall of the Marquise de Prie.

Sources
 M.H. Thirion, Madame de Prie (Paris, 1905).

References

Attribution

Prie
Prie
18th-century French women
17th-century French women
People of the Regency of Philippe d'Orléans
People of the Ancien Régime
Prie
Prie
18th-century suicides
French salon-holders